Adile Mermerci Anatolian High School is a public high school located in the city of Zeytinburnu of İstanbul province of Turkey. It is found in 1990. Current education language is Turkish. But as a fact of being an Anatolian High School it heavily focuses teaching in foreign languages of English and German. Education period is 4 years including 1 year of Prep Class.
It has 510 students, 41 teachers and 4 executive officers. School contains 20 classrooms, 1 science lab, 1 conference hall, 1 gym and 1 computer laboratory.
As stated in the school's web page their mission is; to bring up young people whose intellectual abilities are not limited by OSS (the Matriculation Exam for University); have developed higher reasoning skills; are adept at using technology; know how to access information; have a working knowledge of a second foreign language and sensitive to social events around them.

High schools in Istanbul
Educational institutions established in 1990
1990 establishments in Turkey
Zeytinburnu
Anatolian High Schools